Wuyi County is a county in southwest-central Zhejiang province, China. It is under the administration of Jinhua city. It is rich in Fluorite and hot spring resorts.

The local government is located in Lushan avenue.

Geography 
The north and west sides of Wuyi are surrounded by mountains.

History 
At the Autumn period in Chinese history, Wuyi belonged to Yue. During the Qin dynasty until the Han dynasty, it belonged to Wushang. In 691, it was renamed as Wuyi. In 1958, Suanping county became a part of Wuyi, increasing the importance of the city.

Administrative divisions
Subdistricts:
Baiyang Subdistrict (白洋街道), Hushan Subdistrict (壶山街道), Shuxi Subdistrict (熟溪街道)

Towns:
Lütan (履坦镇), Tongqin (桐琴镇), Wangzhai (王宅镇), Taoxi (桃溪镇), Quanxi (泉溪镇), Xinzhai (新宅镇), Jiaodao (茭道镇), Liucheng She Ethnic Town (柳城畲族镇)

Townships:
Datian Township (大田乡), Baimu Township (白姆乡), Yuyuan Township (俞源乡), Tanhong Township (坦洪乡), Xilian Township (西联乡), Sangang Township (三港乡), Daxikou Township (大溪口乡)

Climate

Economy 

Wuyi's economy is mainly based on agriculture and tourism.

Industrial districts were limited in an attempt to keep the city focused on tourism. However, some of the most important European manufacturers are located in the Huang Long industry area. Wuyi was chosen by companies such as Littlecherry, Ocean Hardware & Plastics, Australian Sino Paper or Sedeenchina  that prefer to produce in this small village over other nearby options such as Yiwu.

Some of Wuyi tourist attractions are:

 Guo Donggu ecologic village.
 Shouxian Valley
 Qingfeng Zai mountain
 Yanfu temple
 Yuyuan village
 Shuxi bridge

References

County-level divisions of Zhejiang
Geography of Jinhua